Samandi is a town and union council of Lakki Marwat District in Khyber Pakhtunkhwa province of Pakistan. It is located at 32°45'15N 71°4'28E and has an altitude of 401 metres (1318 feet).

References

Union councils of Lakki Marwat District
Populated places in Lakki Marwat District